Ilija Lalević (born 26 November 1987) is a Montenegrin football player.

References

External links
 

1987 births
Living people
People from Bar, Montenegro
Association football forwards
Montenegrin footballers
FK Budućnost Banatski Dvor players
FK Banat Zrenjanin players
FK Teleoptik players
FK Mornar players
FK BSK Borča players
Serbian First League players
Serbian SuperLiga players
Montenegrin First League players
Montenegrin expatriate footballers
Expatriate footballers in Serbia
Montenegrin expatriate sportspeople in Serbia